Ibo Oziti (born 2 April 1974) is a Nigerian wrestler. He competed at the 1992 Summer Olympics, the 1996 Summer Olympics and the 2000 Summer Olympics.

References

1974 births
Living people
Nigerian male sport wrestlers
Olympic wrestlers of Nigeria
Wrestlers at the 1992 Summer Olympics
Wrestlers at the 1996 Summer Olympics
Wrestlers at the 2000 Summer Olympics
Place of birth missing (living people)
Commonwealth Games silver medallists for Nigeria
Commonwealth Games medallists in wrestling
Wrestlers at the 1994 Commonwealth Games
20th-century Nigerian people
21st-century Nigerian people
Medallists at the 1994 Commonwealth Games